The British Chamber of Commerce in Japan is an independent non-profit organisation that promotes trade and aims to strengthen business ties between the UK and Japan. The BCCJ, which marks its 70th anniversary in 2018, is a private membership organisation serving over 970 high-calibre members - of which approximately 218 are member companies.

The BCCJ is open to members of all nationalities, and offers events, networking and promotional opportunities, information services, and access to influential individuals and institutions. Its mission is to strengthen business ties between the UK and Japan, support the business interests of members, and actively encourage new British business into the Japanese market as well as Japanese investment into the UK. The mission is supported by long-standing links with the British Embassy, the British Council, the European Business Council, as well as a network of trade organisations in Japan and the UK.

Early History 1948-1990 

The British Chamber of Commerce in Japan was founded in the early months of 1948 by a number of British businessmen, including the late William Salter and the late Douglas Kenrick. Despite being founded in 1948, it wasn't until 1955 that the use of the name 'British Chamber of Commerce in Japan' was permitted by the Ministry of Trade and Industry. The permission to use this name was followed by the granting of the organisation Foreign Juridical Person status under Article 36 of the Civil Code. The Treaty of Commerce, Establishment and Navigation between Japan and the UK ratified this status in 1963, allowing the chamber to set up a permanent secretariat. In 1968 the BCCJ and the British Embassy Tokyo were involved in the organisation of 'British Week', which was to be held between September 26-October 5, 1969. Furthermore, after 'British Week' the Japanese prime minister is said to have commented that British businesses were not trying hard enough in the Japanese market - leading to the foundation of the British Marketing Centre (BMC) in Aoyama-itchome. In the following years, the British Marketing Centre, alongside the BCCJ and the British Embassy Tokyo were involved in collaboration of campaigns such as Opportunity Japan, Priority Japan and Opportunity Japan, which ran through the 1990s. In 1987, the decision was made to hire an executive director with a media and communications background, an important turning point in terms of advertising and making the BCCJ more accessible to members. Furthermore, in 1987, the chamber office was moved to a central location with improved office space and a large meeting room at its disposal, due to the generous donations to the chamber.

Recent History 

During the 1990s, the BCCJ produced a number of publications, such as Japan Posting, Research and Development in Japan, and Gaijin Scientist. These were the results of initiatives such as the Science and Technology Action Group and the Small and Medium Business Initiative. 
Moreover, in 1997 the British Industry Centre (BIC) was established in Yokohama, due to a collaboration between the BCCJ, the City of Yokohama and Nomura Real Estate, with the support of the British Government and the British Embassy Tokyo. This initiative was designed to encourage British firms to set up and do business in Japan. 
The 1990s also signified the first year that a Japanese member (Sukeyoshi Yamamoto of NSK Ltd.) had been asked to join the Executive Committee.

Following on from the 1990s, the 2000s were also a decade for improved diversity in amongst the BCCJ Executive Committee. This was demonstrated with the election of Alison Pockett as the President in 2004. Executive Director, Lori Henderson, has contributed to the BCCJ's mission by contributing to the local communities and volunteering. She received the Queen's 2013 New Years Honours List for her services in the aftermath of the 2011 Tohoku earthquake. The executive committee and staff continue to reflect the diversity and inclusion policy of the BCCJ. The BBCJ strives to expand their female membership through seeking balance in the business community.

Books for Smiles Project 

The BCCJ's Books for Smiles Project invites firms of all sizes and across all industry sectors to support the professional development of Japan's disadvantaged youth by donating books. All proceeds from the sale of second-hand books are used to provide tuition for youngsters leaving welfare facilities in Japan. Regarding the Books for Smiles Project, the BCCJ is in partnership with NPO Bridge for Smile, a not-for-profit organisation certified by the National Tax Agency which teaches care-leavers how to build social skills, manage a budget, find accommodation and get a job.

British Business Awards 

Held annually by the BCCJ every year, the British Business Awards are a not-for-profit event to recognise innovation and success for organizations across a plethora of industries. Social contributions are awarded based on a commitment to community efforts, environmental sustainability, and recognition for ethical standards. Organizations are judged specifically in these criteria thus to endorse organisation's projects, products, or initiatives to the public.

2017-2018 Executive Committee

High-Profile Visitors to the BCCJ 

 Prince Charles and Princess Diana (1986)
 Margaret Thatcher (1993)
 Tony Blair (1998)
 Sir John Major (2012)
 Prince Andrew (2013)
 Prince William (2015)
 Boris Johnson (2015)

References

External links
 The British Chamber of Commerce Japan (BCCJ) website

Foreign trade of Japan
Japan–United Kingdom relations